The Court of Cassation is the highest court in Senegal. It is based on the model of the French Court of Cassation.

See also
Politics of Senegal
Court of cassation (for a list of other courts of cassation around the world)

Judiciary of Senegal
Senegal